Gabriel Scally may refer to:

 Gabriel Scally (field hockey), Argentine field hockey player
 Gabriel Scally (physician), Northern Irish public health physician